Simone Bourday (1912–1943) was a French stage and film actress.

Selected filmography
 La Vie miraculeuse de Thérèse Martin (1929)
 The Crime of Sylvestre Bonnard (1929)
 The Sweetness of Loving (1930)
 The Voice of Happiness (1931)
 The Train of Suicides (1931)
 The Levy Department Stores (1932)
 In Old Alsace (1933)
 The Faceless Voice (1933)
 The Bread Peddler (1934)
 The Dying Land (1936)

References

Bibliography
 Crisp, Colin. French Cinema—A Critical Filmography: Volume 1, 1929-1939. Indiana University Press, 2015.

External links

1912 births
1943 deaths
20th-century French actresses
French stage actresses
French film actresses